Luis M. Perdomo (nicknamed The Dominican Blur) (born April 27, 1984) is a Dominican former professional baseball pitcher.

Career

Cleveland Indians
Originally signed by the Cleveland Indians, Perdomo played for the GCL Indians in 2006, going 0-2 with a 3.79 ERA in 18 relief appearances. He struck out 28 batters in 19 innings of work. In 2007, he played for the Lake County Captains, going 4-6 with a 3.27 ERA in 56 relief appearances. He had 81 strikeouts in 66 innings of work. He split the 2008 season between the Kinston Indians and Akron Aeros.

St. Louis Cardinals
He was traded to the St. Louis Cardinals organization on July 26, 2008 for Anthony Reyes and finished the season with the Springfield Cardinals. Combined, he went 7-3 with a 2.36 ERA in 55 relief appearances in 2008. He struck out 82 batters in 72 innings.

San Diego Padres
He was selected by the San Francisco Giants in the 2009 Rule 5 Draft on December 11, 2008 and claimed off waivers from the Giants by the San Diego Padres on April 10, . He made his major league debut for the Padres against the New York Mets on April 15, 2009. In the 2009 season, Perdomo was mostly used in low leverage situations. He made one appearance for the Padres in 2010 on August 29, pitching one inning.

Minnesota Twins
On November 17, 2011, Perdomo signed a minor league contract with the Minnesota Twins. He had his contract purchased on July 26, 2012. He spent part of 2012 and 2013 with the Rochester Red Wings.

Washington Nationals
Perdomo signed a minor league deal with the Washington Nationals in January 2014.

Bridgeport Bluefish
Perdomo signed with the Bridgeport Bluefish of the Atlantic League of Professional Baseball for the 2015 season. He was released on July 20, 2015.

York Revolution
On July 24, 2015, Perdomo signed with the York Revolution. Luis resigned with York for the 2016 season. He became a free agent after the 2016 season.

References

External links

SABR

1984 births
Living people
Águilas Cibaeñas players
Akron Aeros players
Bravos de Margarita players
Bridgeport Bluefish players
Dominican Republic expatriate baseball players in Mexico
Dominican Republic expatriate baseball players in the United States
Gulf Coast Indians players
Kinston Indians players
Lake County Captains players

Major League Baseball pitchers
Major League Baseball players from the Dominican Republic
Mexican League baseball pitchers
Minnesota Twins players
New Britain Rock Cats players
People from San Cristóbal Province
Piratas de Campeche players
Portland Beavers players
Rochester Red Wings players
San Diego Padres players
Springfield Cardinals players
Tucson Padres players
York Revolution players
Dominican Republic expatriate baseball players in Venezuela